Bomarion amborense is a species of beetle in the family Cerambycidae. It was described by Galileo and Martins in 2008.

References

Ectenessini
Beetles described in 2008